D'Arcy Wentworth (14 February 1762 – 7 July 1827) was an Irish surgeon, the first paying passenger to arrive in the new colony of New South Wales. He served under the first seven governors of the Colony, and from 1810 to 1821, he was great assistant to Governor Lachlan Macquarie. Wentworth led a campaign for the rights and recognition of emancipists and for trial by jury.

Early life 
D'Arcy Wentworth was born in Portadown, County Armagh, Ireland, the sixth child and fourth son of Martha and D'Arcy Wentworth. His family had left Yorkshire for safe haven in Ireland after the execution of Thomas Wentworth, Earl of Strafford, in 1641. In 1778, aged sixteen, D'Arcy was apprenticed to Alexander Patton, a surgeon-apothecary, in nearby Tandragee. In 1782, he joined the Irish Volunteers (18th Century), one of the local regiments formed during the American War of Independence, to defend Ireland against invasion from France; his commission as a junior officer was signed by George III. In May 1785, having completed a seven-year apprenticeship, D'Arcy left Ireland. He was seeking an appointment with the East India Company, and as the training of Irish surgeons was not recognised in England, it was necessary to go to London to gain accreditation.

Life in England 
Wentworth sailed on the mailboat from Donaghadee to Portpatrick in Scotland. First he went to South Yorkshire, as the guest of his cousin, William Wentworth-Fitzwilliam, 4th Earl Fitzwilliam, at Wentworth Woodhouse. It was the beginning of a lifelong friendship. Fitzwilliam gave D'Arcy encouragement and advice. He attended Whig party gatherings and race meetings at York, Doncaster and Wakefield with Fitzwilliam, who introduced him to the societies of York and London, their up and coming lawyers, young politicians and aspiring bureaucrats.

On 1 December 1785, Wentworth went before the Court of Examiners of the Company of Surgeons in London. He qualified as a Mate to Indiamen, eligible to work with the East India Company, once he had twelve months practical experience walking the wards in one of London's large charity hospitals. Wentworth accepted the invitation of Percivall Pott, one of his examiners, to walk the wards of St Bartholomew's, Smithfield under his direction. He attended lectures by other prominent physicians including John Hunter, and dissections held in the Company of Surgeons' anatomy theatre at the Old Bailey.

Wentworth waited in vain for a position to become available in the East India Company. Warren Hastings had brought peace to India, and the Company had an over supply of surgeons. Wentworth supported himself in London by mastering the art of card playing, and gambling at card tables in several inns and coffee houses, but he found many of those who lost to him would simply refuse to pay.

Eventually, Wentworth pursued a number of prominent players who had defaulted on their debts. Chief Magistrate and novelist Henry Fielding described gambling as the School in which most Highwaymen of great Eminence have been bred. Wentworth was arraigned before the Courts four times for highway robbery, but never convicted. On each occasion his defaulter either failed to appear to prosecute him, found himself unable to positively identify D'Arcy Wentworth, or sought only to name and shame him.

In March 1787, Fitzwilliam's patronage secured Wentworth a direction from the Home Office, to leave without delay for Portsmouth, where the First Fleet was making ready to sail to Botany Bay. He was to seek out John White, Principal Surgeon, on the Charlotte, who could advise him of any vacancies for assistant surgeons on the Fleet. D'Arcy learnt there, that to become a naval surgeon he would require another accreditation from the Company of Surgeons. He returned to his studies, and on 5 July 1787, he was examined a second time by the Court of Examiners and qualified as an Assistant Surgeon, Second Mate, Third Rate.

Arrival in the Colony of New South Wales 
On 17 January 1790, Wentworth left England on the Second Fleet on board the Neptune, the most notorious of the convict transports. The neglect and ill treatment of her convicts resulted in the deaths of one hundred and forty-seven men and eleven women, over 30% of the convicts she transported. Wentworth was on board as a passenger; he had no influence, no position on the ship and no employment arranged in the Colony. He arrived in Sydney on 26 June 1790, and spent his first five weeks assisting the local surgeons to care for the newly arrived convicts.

The Colony was short of food, strict rationing had been in place for three months. Five weeks after the Neptune arrived, to avoid a worsening disaster, Governor Arthur Phillip sent nearly 200 convicts and their superintendents to Norfolk Island on the Surprize, en route to China. Wentworth went with them, "to act as an assistant to the surgeon there, being reputed to have the necessary requisites for such a situation".

Wentworth disembarked at Norfolk Island on 16 August 1790. The Commandant, Lieut. Governor Philip Gidley King appointed him as an unpaid Assistant Surgeon. On the island, he became friends with Captain John Hunter, whose vessel, HMS Sirius, had been wrecked on a sunken reef off the island five months earlier. Hunter and most of his crew were stranded on Norfolk Island for nearly a year, awaiting a vessel to return them to Sydney.

In December 1791, King appointed Wentworth to a second position on Norfolk Island, Superintendent of Convicts, responsible for overseeing up to 150 convict labourers on building projects, land clearing and farm work.  In June 1793, Earl Fitzwilliam offered him a lifeline; he appointed his London lawyer, Charles Cookney, Wentworth's agent, making it possible for him to become an early trader in the Colony.

Public life 
During his thirty-seven years in New South Wales, D'Arcy Wentworth served under the first seven governors of the Colony.

Governor Arthur Phillip, RN, 12 October 1786 to 10 December 1792
Arthur Phillip, the first Governor of New South Wales, returned to England in 1792, after five years in the Colony. He applied for leave in April 1790, and again in March and November 1791, but received no response from London. Weak, ill, and in constant pain, the Governor made his own arrangements. He delegated Major Francis Grose, senior officer of the New South Wales Corps, to act as administrator in his absence, and on 11 December 1792 he left Sydney Town on the Atlantic. Two Aboriginal men, Bennelong and Imeeranwanyee, who had befriended and assisted him during the first years of the settlement, accompanied him to England.

Governor John Hunter, RN, 6 February 1794 to 27 December 1800
Phillip’s successor, Captain John Hunter, was appointed in February 1794. He had been Phillip’s second in command, the captain of HMS Sirius that had provided a naval escort for the First Fleet. He was to return to the Colony on HMS Reliance, but after she was thrown ashore at Plymouth in wild weather, it was another year before he sailed. After an anxious voyage through French infested waters, Governor Hunter arrived in Sydney Town on 7 September 1795, nearly three years after Phillip’s departure.
 
In that time, Major Grose had placed the Colony under martial law. He had abolished the Courts, made generous land grants to his officers and provided them with convict labour, fed and clothed at Government expense. Food produced on their farms could be sold profitably to the Government Stores. Under Phillip rationing had applied to everyone, including the Governor. After a poor harvest in 1793, Grose decreased food rations for the convicts but not for the military.

Phillip had not permitted the military to import spirits or goods to trade. Neither Grose nor William Paterson, who succeeded him in December 1794, imposed these restrictions. Groups of officers chartered ships to deliver alcohol and tradeable goods to the Colony, the scarce coinage was replaced by rum, that became the Colony’s currency, used to pay for labour, food and other necessities. The New South Wales Corps became known as the Rum Corps. When Hunter arrived in late 1795, he found the Colony completely altered, rife with drunkenness and crime. The populace, subject to the whims of the Rum Corps, was riven with divisions and hostilities.

The Rum Corps officers controlled the prices of all imported commodities, and their monopoly over trading reaped enormous profits. Emancipated convicts, those who had served their time, no longer on Government rations, were unable to pay for necessities. If they provided labour to officers or wealthy settlers, they were exploited for negligible reward. Many went into debt or bankruptcy, abandoned their land grants or sold them cheaply to the officers and crowded back into Sydney Town to live or to await an opportunity to join a ship going home.

Governor Hunter gave D’Arcy Wentworth permission to leave Norfolk Island, and he arrived back in Sydney on 5 March 1796. He had worked without a break for six years on the island. He received £40 a year as Superintendent of Convicts, but had not been paid for his work as Assistant Surgeon. His applications for leave and requests for his position to be regularised had been ignored. In London, Earl Fitzwilliam pursued the matter of payment for his service as Assistant Surgeon, and in 1798, as a result of his efforts, Wentworth was paid arrears of £160, for six years work.

Soon after Wentworth’s return, Governor Hunter appointed him to Sydney Cove Hospital as an Assistant Surgeon, replacing Samuel Leeds, who had disqualified himself though drunkenness. In Sydney, Hunter allowed several people, including Wentworth, to act as traders, in an attempt to break the power of the Rum Corps officers through competition, and to lower the price of commodities. On 11 May 1799, he appointed Wentworth Assistant Surgeon at Parramatta, in charge of the hospital there, replacing James Mileham, who was later court martialled for refusing to attend the settlers, free people, and others.

D’Arcy Wentworth took up duty at Parramatta Hospital, ‘’two long sheds, built in the form of a tent, and thatched…capable of holding two hundred patients.’’ It was large and clean with a large vegetable garden attached to it. A week later, on 16 May 1799, Governor Hunter granted him a fourteen year lease over six acres and twenty roods at Parramatta, on a knoll overlooking the river. Wentworth planted a dozen young Norfolk Island pines along the ridge line, and built a comfortable two storey house, that he named Wentworth Woodhouse. John Price, surgeon on the Minerva, visited him there, he described it as charmingly situated and, as Milton says, "Bosom'd high in tufted trees".

Governor Philip Gidley King, RN, 28 September 1800 to 12 August 1806
Wentworth had been friendly with Philip Gidley King on Norfolk Island. On 15 April 1800, King returned to Sydney from London with a dormant commission, to act as governor in the case of the death or during the absence of Captain John Hunter. During Governor Hunter’s final five months in the Colony, Wentworth provided friendship, assistance and undivided loyalty. His support rankled King. Wentworth had been friendly with Philip Gidley King on Norfolk Island, but when King took over as governor, he curtailed D’Arcy Wentworth’s trading, impounded his trading stock and sent him back to Norfolk Island. John Grant, an emancipist, commented, Governor King hates Hunter’s friends.

Captain William Bligh, RN, 13 August 1806 to 26 January 1808
Captain William Bligh, who succeeded King, had D’Arcy Wentworth court martialled for disrespect, the result of conflicting instructions given by the Governor.  As a consequence of Bligh’s belligerence, Wentworth supported Major George Johnston and John Macarthur in the Rum Rebellion on 26 January 1808, that overthrew the Governor and placed him under house arrest.

Major-General Lachlan Macquarie, CB, 1 January 1810 to 1 December 1821
Lachlan Macquarie came ashore in Sydney on 1 January 1810. On 7 January he issued a Government and General Order declaring all official appointments made since Bligh’s arrest null and void. On 20 February 1810, he ordered that D’Arcy Wentworth remain as Principal Surgeon, pending instructions from London. Macquarie recommended his appointment in his first despatch:Mr Wentworth is a gentleman of considerable professional abilities, extremely attentive and humane in his attendance and practice, and in every respect well qualified for being placed at the head of the medical department here.

Under Governor Macquarie, D’Arcy Wentworth found great recognition. From the outset Macquarie respected his judgement, he placed new and heavy responsibilities on his shoulders, and Wentworth responded with absolute loyalty and diligence. Macquarie found him indefagitable in his Exertions and Assiduity.  The two men, both over six feet tall, were the same age, forty-seven, born a fortnight apart in 1762. They shared their generation’s belief in the principles of the Enlightenment. They recognized that reason, science, and an exchange of ideas, knowledge and experience were necessary to progress the Colony and to achieve Macquarie’s vision for a more harmonious and inclusive society.

On 31 March 1810, Macquarie appointed D’Arcy Wentworth, Treasurer of the Colonial Police Fund, the consolidated revenue fund of the Colony. He was effectively the Treasurer of the Colony, responsible for receiving revenue raised from government activities, including three-quarters of all customs duties, fees collected at the port and town of Sydney, licensing fees from markets, inns, hotels and breweries, and the licences recently issued to publicans for vending spirituous liquors. Macquarie ordered the Fund was to be used for:All Gaol and Police Expenses of every description shall be defrayed, together with such other Expended as may be necessarily incurred in ornamenting and improving the Town of Sydney, and in constructing and repairing the Quays, Wharfs, Bridges, Streets and Roads. Wentworth submitted quarterly accounts to the Governor for his approval, that were published in the Sydney Gazette.

On 7 April 1810, Macquarie made Wentworth a Commissioner of the new turnpike road to be built from Sydney to Parramatta and the Hawkesbury. On 17 May 1810, the Governor appointed Wentworth one of two Justices of the Peace. On 11 August 1810, D’Arcy Wentworth was made a member of the Court of Civil Jurisdiction.

On 6 October 1810, Macquarie announced Sydney was to have a single effective police force. He appointed D’Arcy Wentworth Chief Magistrate and Superintendent of Police, informing Lord Liverpool:I found the police of the town of Sydney very defective and totally inadequate to the preserving of peace and good order in this populous and extensive town. Under the Appellation of Superintendent of the Police at Sydney, I have appointed Mr D’Arcy Wentworth, the present Acting Principal Surgeon, whose long residence in the Country gave him so full a Knowledge of the Persons and Characters of the Inhabitants as rendered him particularly well qualified for the Situation…He has merited my fullest Approbation and that of the Public.

In 1814, Macquarie set up the Native Institute for the Education of Indigenous Children, and appointed D’Arcy Wentworth to the committee of management. Wentworth had the respect and trust of the Aboriginal people in Sydney, they could take their grievances to him as Police Magistrate and could look to him for support and redress. Peter Cunningham, a Scot who made four trips to the Colony as ship’s surgeon, before settling in the Hunter Valley, observed:all the Natives around Sydney understand English well, & speak it too, so as to be understood by the residents. The Billingsgate slang they certainly have acquired in perfection, & no white need think of competing with them in abuse or hard swearing, a constant torrent of which flows from their mouths as long as their antagonist remains before them; it is no use for him to reply, his words being quickly drowned in the roar of cursings & contemptuous appellations. I have stood for a considerable time witnessing contests of this kind, our Native satyrs invariably forcing their opponents to retrograde, while the instant blacky perceived whity beating a retreat, he vociferates after him—“Go along you dam rascal; go along you dam scoundrel; go along you dam blackguard” exalting his voice as the enemy retires. But should this volley of abuse provoke “white fellow” to run up and threaten to strike him, “blacky” would dare him to the scratch, threaten him with Jail & Massa Wenta (Mr Wentworth) if he attempted it.

The Rum Hospital
One of Wentworth’s achievements was the construction of new hospital for Sydney. In 1806, Governor Bligh reported the wooden hospital at Dawes Point, that arrived on the Second Fleet, was rotten and decayed, not worth rep’g, and the other hospitals were in a ruinous state. 
Macquarie confirmed this in his first despatch to London: there will be an absolute necessity for building a new general hospital as soon as possible. It was necessary to provide a proper place of reception, and more secure detention of the sick, and of moving it to a more airy and retired situation in the town. Without waiting for a reply, within two months the Governor had called for tenders.
 
Macquarie signed the contract for construction of a new hospital on 6 November 1810, with a consortium of businessmen – Garnham Blaxcell and Alexander Riley, later joined by D'Arcy Wentworth. They would receive convict labour and a monopoly on rum imports, from which they expected to recoup the cost of the building and gain considerable profits. The contract allowed them an exclusive right to import 45,000 (later increased to 60,000) gallons of rum to sell, with the excise collected, paid into the Colonial Fund. Their projected profit on the building of the hospital did not eventuate, as a result of many unforeseen problems and the cost of the remedial work required. On its completion in 1816, convict patients were transferred to the new hospital, known as the "Rum Hospital".

Wentworth made lifelong friends among his fellow surgeons and colleagues in the Colony, but he remained detached from its social castes and allegiances. Historian James Auchmuty commented that despite his general popularity, comparative wealth and powerful connexions at home, Wentworth mixed little in non-official social life, observing, the liberal views imbibed in the Ireland of his youth, which had resulted in more than usual sympathy with the convict population, and the circumstances of his personal life in the Colony prevented him from fully sharing in the social round.

Bank of New South Wales
The Colony of New South Wales was established without any cash. Coinage brought to the Colony leaked out rapidly, mainly on ships that called with necessities, clothes, food, and knick knacks. As a result there was insufficient coinage to permit normal business transactions, forcing the population to rely on local promissary notes and rum.
 
On 30 April 1810, Macquarie wrote to Lord Castlereagh:there is one circumstance to which I beg your Lordship’s most serious attention, as on it seems to hinge much of the future prosperity of this colony. In consequence of there being neither gold nor silver coins of any denomination, nor any legal currency, as a substitute for specie in the colony, the people have been in some degree forced on the expedient of issuing and receiving notes of hand to supply the place of real money, and this petty banking has thrown open a door to frauds and impositions of a most grievous nature to the country at large…At present the agricultural and commercial pursuits of the territory are very much impeded and obstructed by the want of some adequately secured circulating medium.

Under D’Arcy Wentworth, the Colonial Fund had a quasi-bank role, printing and issuing bank notes to people who had claims on the Fund. Wentworth had the Sydney Gazette print books of notes, labelled Police Fund, with four different Sterling values: two shillings and sixpence, five shillings, ten shillings and one pound. To protect against forgery, he had a Latin quotation from Cicero with a decorative border printed on the reverse side, and he signed each note. They circulated throughout the Colony, helping to overcome the shortage of small change.

The idea of establishing a bank was raised in March 1810, but it wasn't until November 1816 that a meeting was held to discuss the proposal. In February 1817, the Bank of New South Wales was established; Macquarie gave it a Charter as a joint stock company, providing its directors with limited liability. The first directors were: D'Arcy Wentworth, John Harris, Robert Jenkins, Thomas Wylde, Alexander Riley, William Redfern and John Thomas Campbell. Campbell, Macquarie’s secretary, was elected the bank's first president; D’Arcy Wentworth was elected president in 1825. The new bank facilitated financial transactions and encouraged commerce; it helped bring to an end the Colony’s dependence on rum as money, and the need for dubious promissary notes. The bank received deposits from the Colonial Fund, previously held by Wentworth.

Macquarie and the Emancipists 
In his third despatch to London, written on Easter Monday 1810, Macquarie reported on what he saw was the Colony’s most pressing problem: I was very much surprised and Concerned, on my Arrival here, at the extraordinary and illiberal Policy I found had been adopted by all the Persons who had preceded me in Office, respecting those Men who had been originally sent out to this Country as Convicts, but who, by long Habits of Industry and total Reformation of Manners, had not only become respectable, but by Many Degrees the most Useful Members of the Community. Those persons have never been Countenanced or received into Society.

I have nevertheless, taken upon my self to adopt a new Line of Conduct, Conceiving that Emancipation, when united with Rectitude and long-tried good Conduct, should lead a Man back to that Rank in Society which he had forfeited, and do away, in as far as the Case will admit, All Retrospect of former bad Conduct. This appears to me to be the greatest inducement that Can be held out towards the Reformation of Manners of the establishment, and I think it is Consistent with the gracious and humane Intentions of His Majesty and His Ministers.

Macquarie welcomed the emancipists into society, he appointed them to positions in the public sector, reversing the previous policy towards former convicts. Most likely D’Arcy Wentworth had advocated on their behalf, for Macquarie had assumed he was an emancipist. He listed for Castlereagh the men who gave the most liberal assistance to government and conducted themselves with the greatest propriety, whom he had: admitted to my table,namely Mr D’Arcy Wentworth, principal Surgeon; Mr William Redfern, Assistant Surgeon; Mr Andrew Thompson, an opulent Farmer and Proprietor of Land; and Mr Simeon Lord, an opulent Merchant., 
On 26 July 1811, Lord Liverpool acknowledged the principles Macquarie had outlined.

The Governor resolutely pursued his new Line of Conduct, championing emancipists of good conduct, raising them into key positions of authority and to a new rank in society. His approach startled and dismayed the Exclusives and wealthier free settlers, and met immediate opposition within the barracks, from the officers of the 73rd Regiment, sent to the Colony to replace the discredited Rum Corps.
The most vigorous opponents of the Governor’s new inclusiveness were the clergy and judiciary. They worked to frustrate and denigrate his progress, and complained noisily to London. They petitioned Members of Parliament, the Colonial Office and influential spokesmen within their own hierarchies, belaboring them with an increasing stream of grievances and gossip. D’Arcy, working close to Macquarie, became an easy target for much of the venom directed towards the Governor.

In London, Opposition support for their campaign spurred the Secretary of State, Earl Bathurst, to propose in April 1817: the appointment of commissioners who shall forthwith proceed to the settlement with full powers to investigate all the complaints which have been made, both with respect to the treatment of convicts, and the general administration of the government.

John Thomas Bigge & his Report
Nearly two years later, on 19 January 1819, John Thomas Bigge was appointed Commissioner of Inquiry, with a private instruction from Earl Bathurst to end Macquarie’s dream of an inclusive society in the Colony.

Bigge did not attack Macquarie directly in his report, tabled in Parliament in 1822 and 1823, though he maligned him to the authorities in London. In his attempt to discredit Macquarie, Bigge’s report  took aim at those closest to the Governor. He attacked D’Arcy Wentworth in particular, personally and professionally, and others who supported Macquarie’s policy of a more inclusive society, including William Redfern and J.T. Campbell, the Governor’s Secretary.

In May 1818, D’Arcy Wentworth had submitted his resignation as Principal Surgeon. Macquarie recommended that William Redfern, his Assistant Surgeon, an emancipist, replace him. Bigge opposed his appointment. On 23 October 1819, three weeks after James Bowman, Wentworth's replacement, arrived with Commissioner Bigge, he retired as Principal Surgeon. He had served 29 years as a surgeon in New South Wales, ten of those as Principal Surgeon. The Government and General Order announcing his retirement included a note from the Governor:His Excellency would be doing Injustice to his own Feelings as well as to the Merits of Mr Wentworth, were he not to express an entire Satisfaction at, and unqualified Approbation of, the able, zealous, humane and intelligent Manner in which he has uniformly conducted the Duties of Principal Surgeon; and which His Excellency is happy to bear Testimony, were also conducted with the strictest Honour and Integrity. And whilst His Excellency regrets the Retirement of so able and useful a Medical Officer, he doubts not that the numerous and humane and charitable Acts which have so eminently distinguished his Professional Character during a long Course of Years will afford him a constant Source of the most consolatory and gratifying Reflections on every Retrospect of his active and important Public Service.

In March 1820, Wentworth resigned as Superintendent of Police, and received another public acknowledgement from Macquarie:In receiving Mr Wentworth’s resignation of the office of Superintendent of Police, which he has filled for nearly ten years past with equal credit to himself and benefit to the community, his Excellency feels it due to that Gentleman to express in this public manner his unqualified approbation his steady, upright, able and impartial conduct in the discharge of its arduous and important duties.
Six months later, when Wentworth resigned as Treasurer of the Police Fund, Macquarie made a furtherpublic Testimony of Approbation of his honourable, zealous, and punctual discharge of the important Trust which has been confided to him for upwards of ten Years past as Treasurer of the Police Fund.In his Report, Bigge  referred to the punctuality and credit with which Mr Wentworth acquitted himself in the discharge of his duty as Treasurer.

A few months later, on 26 March 1821, Wentworth’s replacement William Minchin died. Macquarie persuaded him to return as Superintendent of Police and Treasurer of the Colonial Revenue, writing to Earl Bathurst, there was no-one else in the Colony capable of performing the duties. D’Arcy agreed to his request, and on 21 July 1821, his return was greeted with wide acclaim.

On 31 January 1822, his sixtieth birthday, Macquarie invited D’Arcy and other close friends to celebrate. At day break on 12 February 1822, with his wife Elizabeth and son Lachlan, he passed through an immense concourse to the harbour, filled with a great gathering of launches, barges, cutters, pinnaces and wherries, and went aboard the Surry, for the voyage home. The Surry was towed slowly through the ships in the cove, which were all manned with colours displayed, and many of them saluting in honour of the occasion, the Battery saluting at the same time with 19 guns. The New Fort (named Fort Macquarie) and all the Rocks on Bennelong Point, as well as the Dawes Battery and the Rocks on the Northern side of the Harbour were covered with men, women and children and a vast number of boats were also sailing or rowing in the Harbour, full of People – cheering us repeatedly as we passed along through them.
The Sydney Gazette reported: never did Sydney look so attractive and gay. The shores were lined with spectators, innumerable, but on each countenance was an indication of feeling too big, too sincere for utterance.

Major-General Sir Thomas Brisbane, CB, 1 December 1821 to 1 December 1825
D’Arcy Wentworth continued to serve and advise Macquarie’s successor, Governor Brisbane. He remained Treasurer of the Colonial Revenue until the arrival of his replacement, William Balcombe, in April 1824. Brisbane recommended him as chairman of the Court of Quarter Sessions, and he was elected by his brother magistrates in November 1824, but he declined, reluctant to implement the more punitive regime recommended by Bigge, and to be responsible for ensuring his fellow magistrates did likewise.  He served as Superintendent of Police until Captain Francis Rossi arrived to replace him on 19 May 1825, when he retired altogether from public life. The Bench of Magistrates publicly thanked him on his retirement, stating they echoed the Public voice, and were indebted to his superior information in dispensing Justice.

As a public official, Wentworth’s capacity to advocate openly for reform had been constrained. Free of the obligations of public office, he was free to give his full support to the emancipist cause, to enter political debate, and to work with his son William Charles, as an advocate for an independent constitution for the Colony. In October he made a formal request to Brisbane, with two Parramatta magistrates, for respectable emancipists to be added to the lists of jurors. Brisbane sent their petition to Earl Bathurst for his attention.

In May 1825, Governor Brisbane was recalled. On 26 October 1825, D’Arcy Wentworth presented an Address of Farewell to him on behalf of the Emancipists. He arranged the Official Farewell Dinner for the Governor, with one hundred guests, at the Woolpack Inn in Parramatta on 7 November 1825. D’Arcy sat beside the Governor at the dinner, but he was ill and he retired early.

His son William proposed the toasts, to the King, to Governor Brisbane, to the prosperity of Australia and to the memory of Governor Phillip. In solemn silence they toasted the memory of Governor Macquarie. Then they charged their glasses and drank to the health of D’Arcy Wentworth. William returned thanks on his behalf, acknowledging he was proud to be the son of such a worthy man, proud that the community possessed this upright and zealous friend of liberty.

At his farewell dinner, Governor Brisbane, in defiance of the Exclusives and the Bigge Report, recognised the importance and significance of the Emancipists, and he undertook to champion their cause with the British Government.

Lieut. General Sir Ralph Darling, GCH, 19 December 1825 to 21 October 1831
Governor Darling arrived in Sydney on 17 December 1825, to actively implement the socially destructive policies recommended in the Bigge Report. Darling’s policies made life more punitive for the convicts and more onerous for the soldiers. Emancipists and convicts were now excluded from Government employment. Freed convicts who had been given pardons by the Crown were now dealt with by the courts as convicts without status; emancipists and descendants of convicts were excluded from Government House.

Under Darling, as a consequence of the Bigge Report, all heads of Government agencies were replaced with new appointments from London; many wealthy settlers arrived, rapidly expanding the frontier of settlement and increasing the rate of dispossession of the Aboriginals. Darling appointed many of these wealthy settlers as magistrates, and allowed the settlers and Mounted Police a freer hand to deal more punitively with convict absconders, bushrangers and Aboriginals.
 
In dealing with clashes between the settlers and Aboriginal land owners, Darling followed Earl Bathurst’s instructions - to treat Aborigines as enemy combatants not British subjects. He supported “dispersals” of any gatherings of Aborigines, he used the Military to suppress Aboriginal dissent, and issued muskets to settlers in the Hunter Region for them to defend themselves.

Under Darling, no longer an officer of the Crown, D’Arcy Wentworth was free to promote the cause of the Emancipists and trial by jury, and he became their figure head and leader. The press came under pressure for its criticism of the Governor and government policies. D’Arcy initially led the protagonists supporting freedom of the press, a fully elected representative government for the Colony, and no taxation without representation. Amongst the leading agitators were the Australian newspaper and its proprietors: two barristers, Robert Wardell and William Charles Wentworth, D’Arcy Wentworth’s son. Following Darling’s persecution of two soldiers, Sudds and Thompson in November 1826, that resulted in the death of Sudds,The Australian pressed for the recall of Governor Darling. William Wentworth became the voice for representative government for the Colony, and for Governor Darling’s recall.

Private life 

On board the convict transport Neptune Wentworth entered a relationship with a convict girl, Catherine Crowley. She remained his partner in the Colony until her death at Parramatta in January 1800. Their son William Charles was born at sea on the Surprize, standing off Norfolk Island in a violent storm on 13 August 1790; a daughter, Martha, died at four months, during an outbreak of fever carried by the Third Fleet; two more sons followed, D’Arcy, born in 1793, and John in 1795.

D’Arcy Wentworth made numerous attempts to return to England from Norfolk Island and from Sydney. In 1802, Wentworth sent his two eldest sons, William and D’Arcy, to school in England, intending to follow as soon as he was able. In 1805, from Norfolk Island, banished by Governor King, he sent his youngest son John, to join them.

In 1807, Fitzwilliam, appalled by reports of Bligh’s behaviour towards D’Arcy Wentworth, applied to Viscount Castlereagh, Secretary of State for the Colonies, for him to be given leave of absence to return to London. Fitzwilliam wrote again the following year, to inform Castlereagh that Wentworth had been: suspended from the duties of his office & consequently from its emoluments, this devoted man is retained a prisoner in the Colony.

Bligh named D’Arcy Wentworth as one of the twelve ringleaders of the Rum Rebellion, declaring them to be in a state of mutiny and rebellion He wanted them arrested and charged with treason. he forbad them leaving the Colony under any circumstances, proclaiming that ships’ masters would take them, at their peril.

In late July 1808, Wentworth finally received permission from Lord Castlereagh to leave the Colony, allowing him to return to England, but it had come too late. Bligh was under house arrest in Government House, his rage undiminished, and plans were under way for him to return to England. All those involved in the Rum Rebellion anticipated harsh repercussions. Wentworth knew Bligh’s anger would be directed at him; he believed he would be arrested and charged with treason when he arrived in England. He expected no leniency. He replied, I am under the painful necessity of declining to avail myself of the leave granted me, until the result be known. He resolved to remain in the Colony and see out the storm from a safe distance.

In 1818 Wentworth entered a period of grief and dark reflection: he lost his energy, he was tired, his health began to trouble him. He decided to withdraw from his commitments. On 5 May 1818, after a conversation with Macquarie, he submitted his resignation as Principal Surgeon. By July 1820, he had resigned from all his public offices, other than a weekly attendance on the bench at Parramatta.

Wentworth’s hopes for a quiet retirement were disrupted by the arrival of Commissioner Bigge, who asserted his authority over the Governor, attacking him and his administration. Wentworth was called to attend Macquarie, as stress and despair affected his health.

In 1821, Wentworth leased Wentworth Woodhouse in Parramatta, and moved to live at his farm Home Bush. By 1823, he had acquired 17,000 acres of land, that he used to produce meat for the Colony just as he had done on Norfolk Island. In the early 1800s, he had bought a prize stallion named Hector, imported from India, from Arthur Wellesley, later Duke of Wellington. When Hector arrived, there were fewer than three hundred horses in the Colony, by 1821, there were more than four thousand. With his prize sire, Wentworth bred carriage horses and racehorses, Hector was the great foundation sire of Australian Cavalry horses known as Walers, for New South Wales. The first exports of Walers, as light cavalry horses, began in 1816. In the First World War around one hundred and sixty thousand Walers were sent overseas, between 1861 and 1931 almost half a million were exported.

Death 
In the winter of 1827, a severe strain of influenza swept through the Colony. On Saturday, 7 July 1827, a cold winter morning, D’Arcy Wentworth died of pneumonia at his farm, Home Bush. On Monday 9 July, despite dreadful weather and the risk of influenza, a funeral procession more than a mile long, with forty carriages and more than fifty men on horseback, accompanied his hearse on its journey to Parramatta. D’Arcy Wentworth was buried there, in St John’s cemetery. The inscription on his tomb reads: "an honest man, the noblest work of God". He left two mature sons, William Charles and D’Arcy, children of Catherine Crowley, and seven children with Mary Ann Lawes, three sons and four daughters; their fourth son was born in 1828. Wentworth named her in his will as: "my dear friend Ann Lawes the mother of seven of my children". After his funeral the mourners gathered at Hannah Walker’s Red Cow Inn at Parramatta, to salute his life and drink a toast to his memory.

The Monitor described D’Arcy Wentworth as "a lover of liberty on whom the people could rely, the natural protector of the people’s rights. He was a lover of freedom; a constant and steady friend to the people; a kind and liberal master; a just and humane magistrate; a steady friend".

The Australian noted his reputation as a doctor and as a magistrate: "As a medical practitioner, Mr Wentworth was distinguished for his tenderness with which he treated his patients of every degree, and that class of unfortunate persons whom the charge of General Hospital placed so extensively under his care. He was peculiarly skilful in treating the diseases of children… As an able, upright and impartial Magistrate, Mr Wentworth’s merits were well remembered by all classes of the community".

Sydney Gazette acknowledged Wentworth had "studiously devoted the best part of his eventful life to the service of its public, he was loyal from principle, and indefatigable in his public career; a Patriot in whom were blended the political virtues of loyalty and independence".

Recognition
The Sydney suburbs of Wentworthville and Wentworth Point, the New South Wales town, Wentworth, the federal electorate of Wentworth, more than sixty avenues, drives, places, roads, streets and ways in Sydney, and more than twenty in both Melbourne and Brisbane, are named Wentworth, in honour of D'Arcy and his son, William Charles. Darcy Street (formerly D'Arcy Street), within Parramatta, was named for D’Arcy Wentworth. Woodhouse Lane, also within Parramatta, was named after the two storey house, Wentworth Woodhouse, he built nearby. In 1824, explorer Hamilton Hume named an imposing peak in the Victorian Central Highlands, Mount Wentworth, after D'Arcy Wentworth. In 1836, Sir Thomas Mitchell noting that Port Philip was visible from the summit, renamed it Mount Macedon.

References

Citations

Sources
 Auchmuty, J.J. (1967) Wentworth, D'Arcy (1762-1827), Australian Dictionary of Biography, Volume II, Melbourne University Press.
 Barker, Hedley Philip (1971), 'D'Arcy Wentworth', with bibliography, unpublished thesis submitted for M.A., Department of History, University of New England, Armidale, NSW. Includes illustrations, maps, portraits.
 Burke, Bernard (1891). A Genealogical and Heraldic History of the Colonial Gentry (aka Burke's Colonial Gentry ) vol 1. p 95-97. London, Harrison & Sons, 1891.
 Connor, John (2002) The Australian Frontier Wars 1788-1838, University of New South Wales Press, Sydney.
 Dermody, Kathleen (1990) D'Arcy Wentworth 1762-1827, A Second Chance. PhD thesis, Australian National University, Canberra, ACT.
 Historical Records of Australia, series 1, volumes 2 to 13, series 4, volume 1.
 Historical Records of New South Wales, volumes 1, 5, 6 and 7.
 Oxford Dictionary of National Biography, OUP, 2004.
 Ritchie, John (1997).  The Wentworths: Father and Son. The Miegunyah Press at Melbourne University Press.  . 
 Walker, William Wallace, Jane & D'Arcy: Jane Austen & D'Arcy Wentworth. Volume 1, Folly is not always Folly; Volume 2, Such Talent & Such Success. Arcana Press. Sydney. 2017.

External links 
 State Records of NSW, Wentworth, D'Arcy (1811-Feb 1818)
 State Records of NSW, Wentworth, D'Arcy (Apr 1818-Feb 1822)
 State Records of NSW, Wentworth, D'Arcy (Mar 1822-Nov 1824)
 State Records of NSW, Wentworth, D'Arcy (Dec 1824) to West, James (1823)
 Australian Obituaries; Australian (Sydney), 11 July 1827, p 4: The Australian. D'Arcy's son, William Charles, was a joint owner of the Australian newspaper.
 Australian Dictionary of Biography: D'Arcy Wentworth
 http://www.janeanddarcy.com
 D’Arcy Wentworth: Heroic Inspiration?

1762 births
1827 deaths
Australian surgeons
Colony of New South Wales people
History of Sydney
People from Portadown
Medical doctors from Sydney
19th-century Australian public servants